Wünnewil railway station is a railway station in the municipality of Wünnewil-Flamatt, in the Swiss canton of Fribourg. It is an intermediate stop on the standard gauge Lausanne–Bern line of Swiss Federal Railways.

Services 
The following services stop at Wünnewil:

References

External links 
 
 

Railway stations in the canton of Fribourg
Swiss Federal Railways stations